Takasagoagonum is a genus of ground beetles in the family Carabidae. This genus has a single species, Takasagoagonum scotus. It is found in Taiwan and temperate Asia.

References

Platyninae